Sauchen is a village in Aberdeenshire, Scotland that lies  west of Dunecht and  west of Aberdeen.

Near the centre of the village lies Sauchen Play Park for children. There are no amenities like shops, cafes, restaurants, bars, or hotels in the village.

Nearby is Shiels, an eighteenth century mansion with gathering hall. It was built in 1742 for West India trader, Charles MacKay of Shiels.

Sources
Sauchen in the Gazetteer for Scotland.

References

Villages in Aberdeenshire